Sakari Manninen (born 10 February 1992) is a Finnish professional ice hockey forward currently playing with the Henderson Silver Knights in the American Hockey League (AHL) while under contract with the Vegas Golden Knights of the National Hockey League (NHL).

Playing career
Manninen made his Liiga debut playing with Oulun Kärpät during the 2013–14 Liiga season.

After the 2018–19 season, placing second on Jokerit in scoring with 20 goals and 48 points in 62 games, Manninen was traded by Jokerit to fellow KHL club, Salavat Yulaev Ufa, in exchange for financial considerations and the rights to Miro Heiskanen and Henrik Borgström on 17 May 2019.

In March 2022, while in his third season with the club, Manninen left Salavat Yulaev Ufa during playoffs due to the Russian invasion of Ukraine.

On 13 July 2022, Manninen as an undrafted free agent, opted to move to North America and was signed to his first ever NHL contract after agreeing to a one-year, $750,000 contract with the Vegas Golden Knights for the  season.

International play

In 2019 IIHF World Championship Manninen was the point leader of the Finnish national team that claimed the world championship.

Career statistics

Regular season and playoffs

International

Awards and honours

References

External links

1992 births
Living people
Finnish ice hockey forwards
Henderson Silver Knights players
Hokki players
Jokerit players
KalPa players
Örebro HK players
Oulun Kärpät players
Ice hockey players at the 2018 Winter Olympics
Ice hockey players at the 2022 Winter Olympics
Olympic ice hockey players of Finland
Medalists at the 2022 Winter Olympics
Olympic gold medalists for Finland
Olympic medalists in ice hockey
Salavat Yulaev Ufa players
Sportspeople from Oulu